Joël André Ornstein (born December 31, 1954), a French-born financier. He is the Chairman, Managing Partner and co-founder of Monument Capital Group Holdings LLC, a private equity investment firm. He has been based for long periods in New York where he started his career as an investment banker in the early 1980s. He has worked in alternative and private equity investing since 1989 when he established Majorn Corp., as a joint venture partner of The Carlyle Group and Euris-Rallye group.

Biography
Ornstein's maternal grandparents, the Aisinmans, founded and controlled Petrol-Block, the London and Paris listed energy group operating in Ploiesti, Romania, a region which was then the world's third oil exporter and the main source of oil in Europe in the early 1900s', besides Baku in Russia. The company was seized during World War II. An uncle, Dr. Leonhard Hammerbacher, played a prominent role in the Adenauer led reconstruction of Germany after the War, among other as board chairman of the Industry Employers' Association (DIHK), the engineering group Brown Boveri BBC, the Dresdner Bank and Allianz Insurance.

Ornstein graduated with a grande école degree, a master's degree in business administration and a Diplom-Kaufmann degree from ESCP Europe, City University London and University of Düsseldorf. At the age of 22, he received an SM in finance, from the MIT Sloan School of Management, and was a research fellow at MIT, working with Nobel laureate in economics, Prof. Emeritus Franco Modigliani.

After bank training in London and Germany (Deutsche Bank) where he was introduced to Dr Hermann Abs, he joined in 1979 the "old-line" securities firm, Dean Witter Reynolds (now Morgan Stanley) in New York. He became a vice president and was transferred after the firm's acquisition by Sears, Roebuck & Co., the U.S. retail conglomerate, to the newly-formed international trading house Sears World Trade in 1982. He was in charge of corporate development and acquisitions under former Securities and Exchange Commission chairman, Roderick Hills, and former U.S. Secretary of Defense and President's national security adviser, Frank Carlucci.

After pursuing corporate finance at the First Boston Corporation (now Credit Suisse), in the era of the Joe Perella and Bruce Wasserstein deal-making duo, he was called in 1989 by his former boss, Frank Carlucci, then chairman of the nascent private equity firm, The Carlyle Group, to help establish the firm overseas. He has worked very closely over the early years of Carlyle with Carlucci and the co-founders, David Rubenstein, Bill Conway and Dan D'Aniello.

Following the establishment of Carlyle in Europe in 1989, he embarked on a 25-year, multi-billion dollar deployment program of seed, fund and direct corporate investments covering hundreds of emerging asset managers in the U.S., Europe and globally—some of which have become world's market leaders. Such investment program was undertaken as a 20-year-long adviser to and board member of Jean-Charles Naouri's investment holding company, the $50 billion Euris-Rallye group which controls the Casino Group supermarket conglomerate. Naouri, an academic prodigy, with a PhD in mathematics he obtained at the age of 19, is recognized as the top brass government architect of the financial markets reform in France under President Mitterrand, as well as the canny businessman at the helm of the thriving revamping and globalization of the $70 billion Casino Group.

Professional boards and affiliations
Former and current:

Board of directors
 Veea Inc. (Vice Chairman)
 Hyperloop Transportation Technologies
 Baker & Taylor
 DLB Oil & Gas
 Euris S.A.
 Euris, Carlyle & Cie (CEO)
 Euristates (Chairman)
 Euris North America Corp. (Chairman)
 Euris Real Estate Corp. (Chairman)
 Nets Sports & Entertainment
 Romulus Capital (Chairman)
 Sears World Trade
 Smart & Final
 The Athlete's Foot

Senior advisory, limited partner or general partner boards
 Apollo Fund I
 Carlyle Equity Partners Funds I, II, III
 Carlyle Real Estate Partners I, II
 Collabrium Capital Advisors
 Clermont Energy Partners
 Lexington Capital Partners I, II, III, IV, V
 W.L. Ross Funds I, II
 Wexford Capital Funds I, II, III; Wexford-Euris Special Situations Fund

Other activities
 M.I.T. Sloan Executive Boards
 M.I.T. Center for Finance & Policy Advisory Board
 M.I.T./NCATS Working Group
 Founding member, The Cure Alliance
 Former board member, The Byrd Hoffman Watermill Foundation

References

External links
 HCT Global Entrepreneurship 2010, Higher College of Technology, UAE; HCT Speaker Bio.
 Market Visual Professional Search
 Smart & Final Board of Directors.
 Byrd Hoffman Watermill Foundation, Board of Directors
 Bloomberg Businessweek

1954 births
Living people
French financiers
American financial businesspeople